The Islamic Azad University, Science and Research Branch, Tabriz (Persian: دانشگاه آزاد اسلامی واحد علوم و تحقیقات تبریز) (also informally referred to as O.T.T)is one of the many campuses affiliated with the Islamic Azad University, and is located in Tabriz.
The University has a student body of approximately 3000 including graduate students.
The university was founded in 2007.

Tabriz Science and Research
Education in Tabriz
Buildings and structures in Tabriz
Educational institutions established in 2007
2007 establishments in Iran